The Computer University, Myitkyina is situated in No. 21/23 between ZawJun and Taryoe street in the Shansu (south) quarter, in Myitkyina, capital city of Kachin State in Myanmar. On 20 January 2007, GCC (Myitkyina) was promoted to the Computer University (Myitkyina).

Program
Post Graduate

Post Graduate Diploma

Graduate Degree

Undergraduate program

Department
 Software Department and its responsibilities
 Hardware Department and its responsibilities
 Myanmar Department and its responsibilities
 English Department and its responsibilities

Website
https://web.archive.org/web/20110719005332/http://www.ucsy.edu.mm/myitkyinacu/index.php

Technological universities in Myanmar